Vellarakkad  is a village in Thrissur district in the state of Kerala, India.

Demographics
 India census, Vellarakkad had a population of 5418 with 2567 males and 2851 females.

References

Villages in Thrissur district